Jean M. Hunhoff (born December 30, 1953) is an American politician and a Republican member of the South Dakota Senate since 2021.  She has also served in the South Dakota House of Representatives representing District 18 from 2001 to 2007 and again from 2015 to 2021. She previously served in the South Dakota Senate from 2007 to 2015. Hunhoff was the mayor of Yankton from 1995 until 1997.

Education
Hunhoff earned her BSN from South Dakota State University, her MSN from the University of Nebraska Medical Center, and her MHA from the University of Minnesota Medical School.

Elections

South Dakota House of Representatives

2000 When House District 18 incumbent Republican Representative Donald Munson ran for South Dakota Senate, Hunhoff and incumbent Representative Matt Michels were unopposed for the 2000 Republican Primary and won the four-way November 7, 2000 General election where Representative Michels took the first seat and Hunhoff took the second seat with 4,279 votes (26.34%) ahead of Democratic nominees Adam Healy and Nick Braune.
2002 Hunhoff and incumbent Representative Matt Michels were unopposed for the June 4, 2002 Republican Primary and won the four-way November 5, 2002 General election where Representative Michels took the first seat and Hunhoff took the second seat with 4,699 votes (28.98%) ahead of Democratic nominees Scott Swier and Jay Blankenfeld.
2004 Hunhoff and incumbent Representative Matt Michels were unopposed for both the June 1, 2004 Republican Primary and the November 2, 2004 General election where Representative Michels took the first seat and Hunhoff took the second seat with 5,993 votes (46.61%).

South Dakota State Senate

2006 When District 18 incumbent Democratic Senator Garry Moore was term limited from remaining in the Senate and ran for a District 18 House seat, Hunhoff was unopposed for the June 6, 2006 Republican Primary and won the November 7, 2006 General election with 4,811 votes (54.61%) against Democratic nominee Curt Bernard.
2008 Hunhoff was unopposed for the June 3, 2008 Republican Primary and won the November 4, 2008 General election with 6,525 votes (66.94%) against Democratic nominee Bill Kerr.
2010 Hunhoff was unopposed for both the June 8, 2010 Republican Primary and the November 2, 2010 General election, winning with 5,915 votes.
2012 Hunhoff was unopposed for the June 5, 2012 Republican Primary and won the November 6, 2012 General election with 6,317 votes (65.13%) against Democratic nominee David Allen.

South Dakota House of Representatives

2014 Hunhoff was term limited from the South Dakota State Senate so she ran for the South Dakota House of Representatives again.
2016 Hunhoff secured another term by gaining the 2nd spot in the November 8, 2016, general election; Republican Mike Stevens received 6,296, Hunhoff received 5,3,93; Democrat David Allen received 3,047 and Democrat Peter Rossiter received 2,250 votes.
2018 Hunoff ran for reelection and secured the 2nd seat in the November 6, 2018, general election; Democrat Ryan Cwach received the most votes with 4,552 votes; Hunhoff received 4,444 votes; Republican Max Farver received 3,782 votes and Democrat Terry Crandall received 3,547 votes.

South Dakota State Senate
 2020  Hunhoff ran for and was elected to the state Senate with 6,342 votes defeating Jordan Foos who received 4,255 votes.

References

External links
Official page at the South Dakota Legislature

Jean Hunhoff at Ballotpedia
Jean Hunhoff at OpenSecrets

1953 births
Living people
Mayors of places in South Dakota
Republican Party members of the South Dakota House of Representatives
People from Yankton, South Dakota
Republican Party South Dakota state senators
South Dakota State University alumni
University of Minnesota Medical School alumni
University of Nebraska Medical Center alumni
Women state legislators in South Dakota
21st-century American politicians
21st-century American women politicians
Women mayors of places in the United States
20th-century American politicians
20th-century American women politicians